Carnarvon and Caernarvon are forms of the name Caernarfon which are no longer used for the town in north Wales, but remain in use in other contexts. The first two forms are in English orthography and the third is the Welsh spelling, adopted in English since the 1970s. Most places and things named after Caernarfon use one of the former spellings.

Places

Australia
Queensland
 Carnarvon Range
 Carnarvon Highway, state highway 
 Carnarvon National Park
 Carnarvon Gorge
 Carnarvon Park, Queensland, a locality in the Central Highlands Region
 Carnarvon Station Reserve

South Australia
County of Carnarvon (South Australia), a cadastral unit of land administration on Kangaroo Island

Western Australia
 Carnarvon (biogeographic region), IBRA region
 Carnarvon, Western Australia, coastal town 
 Carnarvon Airport (Australia)
 Carnarvon County, Western Australia
 Carnarvon Range (Western Australia)
 Carnarvon Tracking Station
 Carnarvon xeric shrublands, deserts and xeric shrublands ecoregion
 OTC Earth Station Carnarvon
 Shire of Carnarvon, local government area

Canada
 Caernarvon (Edmonton), residential neighbourhood in Edmonton, Alberta
 Carnarvon Elementary School, Vancouver, British Columbia
 Carnarvon (Ontario), Hamlet in Minden Hills, Haliburton County, Ontario

Hong Kong
 Carnarvon Road, Tsim Sha Tsui, Kowloon

New Zealand
 Carnarvon, former name of the small town of Himatangi

South Africa
 Carnarvon, Northern Cape, town in the Karoo region
 Carnarvon Airport (South Africa)

United Kingdom (Wales)
 Caernarfon, town in Gwynedd, north-west Wales
 Caernarfon Airport
 Caernarfon Castle, castle constructed by King Edward I of England
 Caernarvon railway station (closed 1970, originally spelled "Carnarvon")
 Caernarfon railway station (Welsh Highland Railway, opened 1997)
 Carnarvon (Pant) railway station a temporary terminus on the town's southern outskirts in the late 1860s
 Carnarvon (Morfa) railway station a temporary terminus on the town's southern edge in the late 1860s
 Carnarvon Castle railway station, northern passenger terminus of the Nantlle Railway in the mid-nineteenth century
 Caernarfon Town F.C., football team in the League of Wales
 CR Caernarfon, rugby union team in the Welsh Rugby Union Division Four North League
 Caernarfon Bay, inlet of the Irish Sea defined by the Llŷn peninsula and Anglesey
 Caernarfon (National Assembly for Wales constituency)
 Caernarfon (UK Parliament constituency)
 Caernarfonshire, also spelt Caernarvonshire or Carnarvonshire, one of thirteen historic counties of Wales

United States of America
 Carnarvon, Iowa
 Caernarvon, Louisiana
 Caernarvon Township, Berks County, Pennsylvania
 Caernarvon Township, Lancaster County, Pennsylvania

People
 Earl of Carnarvon, a title created more than once
 Robert Dormer, 1st Earl of Carnarvon (1610–1643)
 Charles Dormer, 2nd Earl of Carnarvon (1632–1709)
 James Brydges, 1st Duke of Chandos, 1st Earl of Carnarvon (1673–1744)
 Henry Herbert, 1st Earl of Carnarvon (1741–1811)
 Henry Herbert, 2nd Earl of Carnarvon (1772–1833)
 Henry Herbert, 3rd Earl of Carnarvon (1800–1849)
 Henry Herbert, 4th Earl of Carnarvon (1831–1890)
 George Herbert, 5th Earl of Carnarvon (1866–1923), financed the excavations which discovered Tutankhamun's tomb
 Henry Herbert, 6th Earl of Carnarvon (1898–1987)
 Henry Herbert, 7th Earl of Carnarvon (1924–2001)
 George Herbert, 8th Earl of Carnarvon (born 1956)

Ships
 , Royal Navy cruiser
 , Royal Navy frigate, launched 1945

Other
 Carnarvonshire Railway
 1945 Caernarvon Boroughs by-election
 Caernarvon tank, a developmental UK heavy tank of 1952
 Carnarvonia (disambiguation)